Llanelli Town Council (Welsh - Cyngor Tref Llanelli) is the community council that governs the majority of wards in Llanelli town. The Council is run by a group or groups who command the support of the majority of the elected representatives.  The current leader is Labour's David Darkin. The council also appoints an annual ceremonial Mayor who presides over meetings of the Council who is known as the Mayor of Llanelli.

Llanelli Town Council governs the area of Llanelli covered by five council wards which elect twenty-two Town Councillors. The five wards with the number of councillors in parenthesis are; Bigyn (6), Elli (2), Glanymor (5), Lliedi (5) and Tyisha (4).

The motto, seen in the coat of arms says "Cyfoeth Cymdeithas: Cymuned", which translates as "A society's wealth is its community".

Current composition

The current mayor is Cllr. Phil Warlow

Election history

2022 Election

2017 Election

Four Labour town councillors defected on 6 March 2019 following claims of bullying. They subsequently sat as independents. In September 2019 former Labour councillor Chris Griffiths joined the Conservatives, doubling their numbers on the council.

2012 Election

2008 Election

2004 Election

1999 Election

List of Town Mayors
Past Mayors of Llanelli

1974/75
T. V. Davies
(Inaugural Town Mayor)

1975/76
V. D. Thomas	

1976/77
Joie Davies	

1977/78
W. Raymond H. Thomas	

1978/79
D. John Harries	

1979/80
Leslie R. Hickman	

1980/81
Ken Davies	

1981/82
Eileen Clarke	

1982/83
Michael Gimblett	

1983/84
Cliff Charles	

1984/85
Margaret Prothero	

1985/86
W. Raymond H. Thomas

1986/87
D. John Harries

1987/88
Leslie R. Hickman	

1988/89
Ken Davies

1989/90
Cliff Charles	

1990/91
Margaret Prothero	

1991/92
Elinor G. Lloyd	

1992/93
Jan Neil

1993/94
Steffan Chrinowsky

1994/95
Carl Lucas

1995/96
Margaret Evans

1996/97
Eric Smith

1997/98
Jan Williams

1998/99
Pam Edmunds

1999/00
Gren Darby

2000/01
Connie Richards

2001/02
Kenneth Rees

2002/03
Edward Skinner

May-Dec 2003
Hywel Phillips

Jan-June 2004
Edward Skinner

2004/05
Eryl Morgan

2005/06
Nigel Bevan

2006/07
Michael Francis

2007/08
Ray Neil

2008/09
Hubert Hitchman

2009/10
John Jenkins

2010/11
Dyfrig Thomas

2011/12
Linda Stedman

2012/13
Winston Lemon

2013/14
Michael Burns

2014/15
Roger Price

2015/16
Shahana Najmi, J.P.

2016/17
William “Bill” Thomas

2017/18
Jeff Edmunds

2018/19
David Darkin

2019/20
John E. Jones

2020-21
Chris Griffiths - the town council's first ever Conservative mayor

2021-22
Michael Cranham J.P.

See also
Llanelli Rural

References

External links
Llanelli Town Council

Llanelli
Community councils of Wales